Festus Gontebanye Mogae (born 21 August 1939) is a Botswana politician and economist who served as the third President of Botswana from 1998 to 2008. He succeeded Quett Masire as President in 1998 and was re-elected in October 2004; after ten years in office, he stepped down in 2008 and was succeeded by Lieutenant General Seretse Khama Ian Khama.

Biography

Early life
Mogae studied economics in the United Kingdom, first at University College, Oxford, and then at the University of Sussex. He returned to Botswana to work as a civil servant before taking up posts with the International Monetary Fund and the Bank of Botswana. He later then served as the governor of Bank of Botswana from 1980 to 1981. He served as the Minister of Finance from 1989 to 1998. He was Vice-President of Botswana from 1991 to 1998.

Presidency
Mogae's party, the Botswana Democratic Party (BDP), retained power in the October 1999 general election, and Mogae was sworn in for a five-year term on 20 October 1999 by Chief Justice Julian Nganunu at the National Stadium in Gaborone. On this occasion, he vowed to focus on the fight against poverty and unemployment.

Following the BDP's victory in the October 2004 general election, Mogae was sworn in for another term on 2 November 2004. Mogae promised to tackle poverty and unemployment, as well as the spread of HIV-AIDS, which he pledged to stop in Botswana by 2016.

On 14 July 2007, Mogae affirmed his intention to resign nine months later. He stepped down as President on 1 April 2008 and was succeeded by Vice-President Lieutenant General Seretse Khama Ian Khama.

Post-presidency
Mogae currently serves as Special Envoy of the United Nations Secretary-General on Climate Change. In 2010, he joined the advisory board of US nonprofit TeachAids. He also currently serves as chairman of the Choppies supermarket group where he earned Pula 529,000 in 2011.

In 2013, along with former President Benjamin Mkapa of Tanzania, Mogae co-chaired a sustainable development symposium, hosted by the UONGOZI Institute in collaboration with Club de Madrid, organisation of which Mkapa was also a member.

Personal life
Festus Mogae married Barbara Mogae in 1967. They have three daughters, born between 1969 and 1987: Nametso, Chedza and Boikaego.

Honours and awards

Mogae was awarded the Grand Cross of the Légion d'honneur by French President Nicolas Sarkozy on 20 March 2008 for his "exemplary leadership" in making Botswana a "model" of democracy and good governance.

 Presidential Order of Honour of Botswana (1989).
 Officier de I’Order Nationale D’e Cote d’Ivoire (1979)
Honorary Degree of Doctor of Laws – University of Botswana (September 1998)
I’Order Nationale du Mali and the HATAB's Award for Outstanding Contribution to Botswana's Tourism Industry (1997)
the Global Marketplace Award by the Corporate Council on Africa - Houston, USA (May 1999)
Honorary Fellowship of the Botswana Institute of Bankers – Gaborone, Botswana (July 1999)
Distinguished Achievement Award for AIDS Leadership in Southern Africa by the Medunsa Trust - Washington DC, USA (June 2000) 
AIDS Leadership Award by Harvard AIDS Institute – Gaborone (December 2001)
2002 Congressional Black Caucus Annual Legislative Conference Weekend Chairman's Award – Washington D.C., USA (September 2002)
Africa-America Institute National Leadership Award – New York, USA (September 2002)
Honorary Fellow – University College Oxford (2003)
The Knight Commander of the Most Courteous Order of the Kingdom of Lesotho – Maseru, Lesotho (April 2004)
The Baylor International Pediatric AIDS Initiative (BIPAI) International Leadership Award – Gaborone (October 2004)
The Golden Plate Award by the Academy of Achievement - New York, USA (June 2005)
The Pan African Tsetse and Tryponofomiasis (PATTEC) by the African Union – Addis Ababa, Ethiopia (January 2007)
Doctorate of Humanity by the University of Limkokwing, Gaborone Botswana (January 2008)
The Commander of the Legion d’Honneur Grand Croix of the Republic of France – Paris, France (March 2008) 
Taylor and Francis Award for significant contribution to women's development and welfare – Gaborone, Botswana (July 2008) 
Croix - Highest award in Madagascar granted to dignitaries of the Nation) Antananarivo, Madagascar (June 2006)

Mogae won the 2008 Ibrahim Prize for Achievement in African Leadership, and will receive US$5 million over 10 years and US$200,000 annually for life thereafter. At London's City Hall on 20 October 2008, former United Nations Secretary-General Kofi Annan stated: "President Mogae's outstanding leadership has ensured Botswana's continued stability and prosperity in the face of an HIV/AIDS pandemic which threatened the future of his country and people."

In addition, he has received a number of honours such as the Naledi Ya Botswana order in 2003 and also  received the Golden Plate Award of the American Academy of Achievement in 2005.

A Trustee of the Rhodes Trust since 2010, and in 2016, Mogae was appointed a Foreign Honorary Member of the American Academy of Arts and Sciences.

References

External links

1939 births
Living people
People from Serowe
Presidents of Botswana
Vice-presidents of Botswana
Finance ministers of Botswana
Governors of the Bank of Botswana
Alumni of University College, Oxford
Alumni of the University of Sussex
Grand Croix of the Légion d'honneur
Botswana Democratic Party politicians
Botswana expatriates in the United Kingdom